Mecke may refer to:

People
 Dieter Mecke (1933–2013), German biochemist
 Karl-Conrad Mecke, iron cross recipient
 Reinhard Mecke (1895–1969), German physicist
 Walter Mecke, iron cross recipient

Places
 Mecke Xace or Məçkə-Xacə, Azerbaijan

Other
 Mecke reagent, used to identify alkaloids and other compounds
 Mecke (horse), Americvan Thoroughbred racehorse